Timothy Endicott (born 9 July 1960) is a Canadian legal scholar and philosopher specializing in constitutional law and language and law. He is the Vinerian Professor of English Law in the University of Oxford, and Fellow of All Souls College, University of Oxford.

From October 2007 to September 2015, he served for two terms as the first Dean of the Oxford Faculty of Law. He was named to the Vinerian Professorship of English Law in 2020.

Education 
After attending Upper Canada College, Endicott studied English and Classics at Harvard. He then obtained a MPhil in Comparative Philology at Oxford University, and law degrees from University of Toronto and Oxford.

Works include

Books 
Vagueness in Law (Oxford University Press 2000).
Properties of Law: Essays in Honour of Jim Harris, with  Joshua Getzler and Edwin Peel (Oxford University Press 2006)
Administrative Law, 4th edition (Oxford University Press 2018)

Articles 
Law and Language

Lectures 
Interpretation and the Rule of Law

References

Living people
Fellows of Balliol College, Oxford
Upper Canada College alumni
Harvard University alumni
Alumni of the University of Oxford
University of Toronto alumni
Canadian legal scholars
Christian philosophers
Legal scholars of the University of Oxford
1960 births
Philosophers of law